The Names Database is a now-defunct social network, owned and operated by Classmates.com, a wholly owned subsidiary of United Online. The site does not appear to be significantly updated since 2008, and has many broken links and display issues. Since 2007, United States and Canadian registrations do not work, and instead redirect to a Classmates.com sign up page. At least half of its members are believed to be outside the United States.

The primary purpose of the website is to reconnect with old friends and classmates, which is related in the site's tagline "Making the World a Smaller Place." After registration, the names of all people in the database are fully searchable.  However, contact with these members is limited until the database is "unlocked" by obtaining a "blue membership".

As of October 2006, blue memberships can be purchased for one- or three-year periods, or obtained for free by referring friends.  However, as of July 2013, there does not appear to be any functioning way to upgrade and there is a permanent message saying "Please come back later" translated into seven languages in that part of the site. A non-searchable static version of the database is nevertheless still available, which lists names and high school affiliations. This static version is freely available (without any registration needed). However, the URL for that static version listed on the explanation page is incorrect and leads to a site with a permanent maintenance message.

History 

Launched by entrepreneur Gabriel Weinberg, the company was acquired by Classmates.com for "approximately $10 million in cash" in March 2006. At the time of acquisition the company had "approximately 50,000 pay subscribers and [was] expected to generate less than a million dollars in revenues" that year. United Online CEO Mark Goldston said the acquisition of "The Names Database is a great addition to Classmates.com and furthers our overall mission of connecting people." As of 2013, United Online no longer mentions the company in its Form 10-K annual report except once to say it "excludes" in its "active accounts" calculation.

Before the acquisition, the company's legal name was actually Opobox, Inc. and was doing business as The Names Database. According to Delaware corporation records (where the company was registered), Opobox had been around since 2001.  For a period of two years the business was registered but inactive. The Names Database was formed in 2003 after Gabriel Weinberg put up pages of names that were subsequently indexed by search engines.

Criticism 

Like other social networks such as Hi5, Names Database has been criticized for being too aggressive at encouraging registrants to refer friends. Upon registration the site immediately asks you to refer friends and then checks the validity of any address you enter, attempting to disallow fraudulent information. However, free access to searching the database is granted in the email confirmation without referring any friends, thus skipping that step. Also, all outgoing emails appear to follow the rules stipulated in the CAN-SPAM Act of 2003 including proper opt-out links, listed physical addresses and information about how the original email address was collected.

Another area of criticism has been the expanded license granted to the site for information entered to it upon registration. However, this license is substantially similar or identical to that granted to other social networking services. Additionally, the site appears to try to collect only the minimal amount of information needed to find an old friend and classmate (name, birth year, email address and high school country with optional maiden name) as opposed to more invasive required information like gender, zip code and birth date as found on other sites.

Classmates.com itself (the parent company) has been criticized for controversial business practices and legal issues, but it is unclear how much of this criticism also applies to their subsidiaries. In any case, The Names Database does provide the option of automatically removing one's listing in the database. However, these instructions have not worked since at least March 2013. Since July 2013 emails sent to the removal address bounce with a "mail transport unavailable" message. All requests for support through the website's form go unanswered, making it impossible now to be removed from the Names Database.

Excerpt from 'The Names Database' Terms of Use:

'You grant Opobox a non-exclusive, worldwide, perpetual, irrevocable, transferable, royalty-free right to (a) use, copy, distribute, transmit, publicly display, publicly perform, reproduce, edit, modify, translate and reformat Your Information in any media now known or not currently known, and (b) sublicense these rights, to the maximum extent permitted by applicable law. Opobox does not control the content posted via the Opobox Web Sites, and as such, does not guarantee the accuracy, integrity, timeliness, reliability, or quality of such Content. You understand that by using the Opobox Web Sites, you may be exposed to Content that is offensive, indecent, or objectionable. Under no circumstances will Opobox or any Opobox Party be liable in any way for any Content, including, but not limited to, for any errors or omissions in any Content, or any loss or damage of any kind incurred as a result of the use of any Content posted, e-mailed, transmitted, or otherwise made available via the Opobox Web Sites.'

See also
 DuckDuckGo

References

External links
 The Names Database

Online person databases
Defunct social networking services